UNICEF Goodwill Ambassador is an official postnominal honorific title, title of authority, legal status and job description assigned to those goodwill ambassadors and advocates who are designated by the United Nations. The United Nations International Children's Emergency Fund (UNICEF) along with other United Nations agencies, has long enlisted the voluntary services and support of prominent individuals as goodwill ambassadors to advocate causes. Their fame helps amplify the urgent and universal message of human development and international cooperation, helping to accelerate programmes for children and youth. UNICEF is responsible for a wide-variety of educational and health projects. UNICEF is greatly responsible for the eradication of polio campaign. There are over 250 UNICEF goodwill ambassadors.

History 
Danny Kaye was the first to hold the goodwill ambassador position, with the title of Ambassador-at-Large granted in 1954. Other celebrities have followed, acting as international, regional or national goodwill ambassadors, depending on their profile, interests, and desired level of responsibility. The goal of the program is to allow celebrities with a demonstrated interest in UNICEF issues to use their fame to draw attention to important issues. This may take the form of public appearances and talks, visits to troubled regions, which draw attention from the media, and use of their political access to advocate UNICEF causes.

Public figures  
As one of the most necessary and popular programs of the United Nations, the use of famous and popular local and regional celebrities is a key element of the UNICEF goodwill ambassador programme. UNICEF does not pay for local advertising, but in all the areas where they exist are well-known for their work through the use of public figures that are both well-known and popular, naturally attract the news media. 

Fame has some clear benefits in certain roles with UNICEF. Celebrities attract attention, so they are in a position to focus the world’s eyes on the needs of children, both in their own countries and by visiting field projects and emergency programmes abroad. They can make direct representations to those with the power to effect change. They can use their talents and fame to fundraise and advocate for children and support UNICEF’s mission to ensure every child’s right to health, education, equality and protection.

See also 
 Goodwill Ambassador
 FAO Goodwill Ambassador
 UNDP Goodwill Ambassador
 UNHCR Goodwill Ambassador
 UNESCO Goodwill Ambassador
 UNODC Goodwill Ambassador
 UNFPA Goodwill Ambassador
 UNIDO Goodwill Ambassador
 UN Women Goodwill Ambassador
 WFP Goodwill Ambassador
 WHO Goodwill Ambassador

References

External links 
UNICEF Goodwill Ambassadors 

United Nations goodwill ambassadors
Goodwill ambassador programmes